Kemul is a rural locality (a selo) in Chaykovsky, Perm Krai, Russia. The population was 557 as of 2010. There are 4 streets.

Geography 
Kemul is located 21 km southwest of Chaykovsky. Kharnavy is the nearest rural locality.

References 

Rural localities in Chaykovsky urban okrug